St. Stanislaus Institute, also known as St. Stanislaus Orphanage and Holy Child Church, is a historic former Roman Catholic orphanage complex located at 141 Old Newport Street in Newport Township, Luzerne County, Pennsylvania within the Diocese of Scranton.

Description
The complex consists of three interconnected and three independent buildings built between 1918 and 1939, built originally for use as an orphanage for Polish children. 

They are the Spanish Revival style boys dormitory (1918), Holy Child chapel (1939), laundry / boiler building, and rectory and garage.  The facility closed in 1972.

It was added to the National Register of Historic Places in 2008.

References

Orphanages in the United States
Properties of religious function on the National Register of Historic Places in Pennsylvania
Churches in Luzerne County, Pennsylvania
National Register of Historic Places in Luzerne County, Pennsylvania